Henry Bowet (died 20 October 1423) was both Bishop of Bath and Wells and Archbishop of York.

Life

Bowet was a royal clerk to King Richard II of England, and at one point carried letters of recommendation to Pope Urban VI from the king.

Bowet became Bishop of Bath and Wells on 19 August 1401, and succeeded to the Archbishopric of York on 7 October 1407, after it had been vacant for two and a half years.

The pope had already appointed Robert Hallam to the northern primacy, but, finding that Henry IV desired to see Bowet installed, he nominated Hallam to the see of Salisbury and gave the pallium to Bowet.

In 1402 Bowet briefly served as Lord High Treasurer, from February to October.

In 1417 the Scots invaded England and sat down before Berwick-on-Tweed. The Duke of Exeter marched to the relief of the town and Archbishop Bowet, then very old and feeble, had himself carried into the camp where his addresses are said to have greatly encouraged the English soldiers. The Scots decamped hastily in the night, leaving behind them their stores and baggage.

Bowet died on 20 October 1423 at Cawood Bishop's Palace and was buried in his cathedral of York Minster.

Citations

References

 Allmand, Christopher Henry V Berkeley: University of California Press 1992 
Chaplais, Pierre, English Diplomatic Practice in the Middle Ages London: Hambledon and London 2003 
 

 

Archbishops of York
Bishops of Bath and Wells
15th-century English Roman Catholic archbishops
1423 deaths
Lord High Treasurers of England
Archdeacons of Richmond
Year of birth unknown
Deans of St. Patrick's Cathedral, Dublin
Burials at York Minster